The Fanambana River is located in northern Madagascar and crosses the Route Nationale 5a near Fanambana. Its sources are situated in the Marojejy Massif and flows into the Indian Ocean south of Vohemar.

References 

Rivers of Madagascar
Rivers of Sava Region